The King and the Queen is a 1998–2000 South Korean television series starring Im Dong-jin and Chae Shi-ra, along with Han Hye-sook, Lee Jin-woo and Ahn Jae-mo. It aired on KBS1 from June 6, 1998, to March 26, 2000, on Saturdays and Sundays at 21:45 (KST) for 186 episodes. The series begins with the death of King Munjong and finished with the Jungjong coup.

Cast

Main
Im Dong-jin as Grand Prince Suyang, later King Sejo
Chae Shi-ra as Queen Sohye, later Dowager Queen Insoo
Han Hye-sook as Queen Junghee, later Grand Royal Dowager Queen Jaseong
Lee Jin-woo as King Seongjong
Kim Min-woo as young King Seongjong
Ahn Jae-mo as Prince Yeonsan, later King Yeonsan
Kim Hak-joon as young Prince Yeonsan

Supporting

Kings and Queens
Jung Tae-woo as King Danjong
Lee Gwang-ki as Crown Prince Uigyeong, later King Deokjong, Queen Sohye's husband.
Lee Yung-ho as King Yejong
Choi Woo-hyuk as King Jungjong
Kim Min-jung as Queen Jungsoon, Danjong's wife.
Kim Sung-ryung as Deposed Queen Yoon, Seongjong's second wife.
Yoon Ji-sook as Queen Junghyun, later Dowager Queen Jasoon; Seongjong's third wife and Jungjong's mother.
Kyeong In-sun as Queen Ansoon, Yejong's second wife.
Shin Ji-ae as young Queen Ansoon
Shin Ji-soo as Queen Gonghye, Seongjong's first wife.
Lee Si-nae as Deposed Queen Shin, Yeonsan's wife.

Princes and Princesses
Kim Jung-eun as Princess Gyeonghye, Munjong's oldest daughter.
Shin Goo as Grand Prince Yangnyung, Taejong's oldest son.
Kim In-tae as Grand Prince Hyoryung, Taejong's second son.
Jung Sung-mo as Grand Prince Anpyung, Sejong's third son.
Jeon Byung-wook as Grand Prince Imyung, Sejong's fourth son.
Lee Jae-shik as Prince Gwisung, Grand Prince Imyung's second son.
Won Suk-yun as Grand Prince Geumsung, Sejong's sixth son.
Kim Sung-soo as Grand Prince Yungeung, Sejong's 15th son.
Lee Sung-yong as Prince Gyeyang, Sejong's eighth son.
Kim Kyung-eung as Prince Yungpung, Sejong's 16th son.
Song Ho-seop as Grand Prince Wolsan, Deokjong's oldest son.
Lee-in as young Grand Prince Wolsan
Park Chan-hwan as Grand Prince Jeahn, Yejong's oldest son.

Production
This series' first title was Life of the Wind, but later change into The King and the Queen due to the same mean with one of Japanese historical drama.
It was originally scheduled to be finish in December 1999, but then finish in March 2000, and planned to deal with the rebellion against King Seongjong, even almost of this story tell about political ambition of Seongjong's mother, Queen Insu after ascending the throne. Meanwhile, due to the extension, this series be more lengthened until Yeonsangun's era.
In this series, the theme song was same with the previous work, Tears of the Dragon. The ratings were sluggish around 10% at first, but in the mid-to-late episode, the ratings rose to the highest of 44.3%. However, this series was noted and caution by the Broadcasting Commission after there is a scene that show a head who falling in pieces and upside down while airing the decapitation of the asshole.
Because in this series has much conflict between the queens and concubines, envy-quarrel for a longtime period, the Korean Women's Associations United select this series as the '99 obstacles to equal broadcasting'.
At the end episodes, Queen Sohye (played by Chae Shi-ra) and her grandson, Yeonsan (played by Ahn Jae-mo) were criticized for being too much in Political Power's ambition.

Awards and nominations

References

External links
 

1998 South Korean television series debuts
2000 South Korean television series endings
1990s South Korean television series
Korean Broadcasting System television dramas
Korean-language television shows
Television series set in the Joseon dynasty
South Korean historical television series
Television series set in the 14th century
Television series set in the 15th century